Bishoff is a surname. Notable people with the surname include:

Heather Bishoff, American politician
Murray Bishoff, American writer

See also
Bischoff